{{Infobox settlement
| settlement_type = Union council
| name            = Tando Fazal
| image_skyline   = 
| imagesize       = 300px
| image_alt       =
| image_caption   = 
| subdivision_type  = Country
| subdivision_name  = 
| subdivision_type1 = Province
| subdivision_name1 = Sindh
| subdivision_type2 = District
| subdivision_name2 = Hyderabad District
| subdivision_type3 = Tehsil
| subdivision_name3 = Hyderabad Taluka (rural)
| population_total     = 
| population_as_of     = 
| population_footnotes = 
| leader_title = chairman
| leader_name = Mir Ali Ahmed Talpur
| leader_title1 = vice-chairman
| leader_name1 = Syed Ali Akber Shah
| website = 
| footnotes = 
}}Tando Fazal''' is a town and union council of Hyderabad District in the Sindh province of Pakistan.

References

Union councils of Sindh
Populated places in Sindh